Norman Derek Matthews, OBE (19 March 1922 – 21 July 1976) was a British colonial administrator and diplomat. He was Governor of Montserrat from 1974 until his death in 1976.

After service in the Royal Navy from 1940 to 1946, Matthews served as a colonial administrator in Nyasaland from 1946 to 1964. From 1964 to 1967 he was a Permanent Secretary in the Government of Malawi. He joined the Foreign and Commonwealth Office in 1967.

References 
 

Governors of Montserrat
1922 births
1976 deaths
Royal Navy personnel of World War II
British expatriates in Malawi